Franklin Avenue can refer to:

Franklin Avenue (Los Angeles)
Franklin Avenue Bridge, Minneapolis
BMT Franklin Avenue Line, a New York City Subway line
Franklin Avenue Shuttle, a shuttle service on the line

See also
Franklin Street (disambiguation)
Franklin Avenue Station (disambiguation)